Zdeněk Kolář and Jiří Lehečka were the defending champions but chose not to defend their title.

Hunter Reese and Szymon Walków won the title after defeating Marek Gengel and Adam Pavlásek 1–6, 6–3, [10–6] in the final.

Seeds

Draw

References

External links
 Main draw

Poznań Open - Doubles
2022 Doubles